Pterolophia nigrodorsalis is a species of beetle in the family Cerambycidae. It was described by Stephan von Breuning and Itzinger in 1943.

References

nigrodorsalis
Beetles described in 1943